The 1907 Villanova Wildcats football team represented Villanova University as an independent during the 1907 college football season. Led by fourth-year head coach Fred Crolius, Villanova compiled a record of 1–5–1. The team's captain was Joseph Slavin.

Schedule

References

Villanova
Villanova Wildcats football seasons
Villanova Wildcats football